Count Giovanni Gallina (30 December 1852 – 17 August 1936) was an Italian diplomat and politician. He became a senator on 16 October 1913.

Biography
Count Giuseppe Pietro Maria Giovanni Gallina was born on 30 December 1852 in Turin, Kingdom of Sardinia, to a father who was an Italian patriot from 1821. 

He graduated in law in 1880. In the same year He started his diplomatic career and was sent first to the Italian legation in St Petersburg, then to the legation in Constantinople, where he remained for several years.

In 1892 he is transferred to Beijing and later was ambassador in Tokyo and Paris. Since 1913 he sat in the Italian senate. He was Italian Ambassador to China from 19 December 1901 until 10 July 1904 and Italian Ambassador to France.

Honors 
 Grand Officer of Saints Maurice and Lazarus 

 Grand Officer of the Order of the Crown of Italy

See also 
 Ministry of Foreign Affairs (Italy)
 Foreign relations of Italy

References

1852 births
1936 deaths
Diplomats from Turin
Ambassadors of Italy to China
Ambassadors of Italy to France
Members of the Senate of the Kingdom of Italy
Italian diplomats
20th-century diplomats